Kamsabhoga  (or Kamsabhoja) was  the name of an ancient country said to be located in the Uttarapatha division of ancient India with its capital being Asitañjana, where king Mahākamsa and his successors of the Kamsavamsa race ruled. Name Kamsabhoga finds mention in the Buddhist traditions only. The Kamsavamsa  dynasty was destroyed by the sons of Devagabbha and Upasagara  known in the Buddhist texts as Andhakavenhudasaputta

References

See also
Dictionary of Pali Proper Names: 

Ancient empires and kingdoms of India
Historical regions of Pakistan

hi:कम्बोज